House at 200 Bay Avenue is a historic home located at Huntington Bay in Suffolk County, New York. It was built about 1890 and is a large, rambling -story, gable-roofed residence with a shingled first floor and stucco and half-timbered second floor. It is representative of the Tudor Revival style.  Also on the property is the building containing the original garage / servant's quarters.

It was added to the National Register of Historic Places in 1985.

References

Houses on the National Register of Historic Places in New York (state)
Houses completed in 1890
Houses in Suffolk County, New York
National Register of Historic Places in Suffolk County, New York